In cricket, a five-wicket haul (also known as a "five-for" or "fifer") refers to a bowler taking five or more wickets in a single innings. This is regarded as a notable achievement.
The Bangladesh Premier League (BPL) is a professional Twenty20 cricket league in Bangladesh which has been held annually since its first season in 2012. Though Following the match fixing scandal, the league was not played in the year 2014. It started again at year 2015, the third season of this tournament. In the eight seasons played, sixteen five-wicket hauls have been taken by fifteen different bowlers.

The first five-wicket haul was taken by Mohammad Sami of the Duronto Rajshahi against the Dhaka Gladiators on 27 February 2012. Sami took five wickets for six runs. The most recent five-wicket haul was taken by Mustafizur Rahman of the Comilla Victorians against Chattogram in Dhaka on 13 January 2020. Mohammad Amir of Khulna Tigers has the best bowling figures in an innings by a player in the competition. It was also the only six-wicket haul. Sami's five wicket haul was also the most economical five-wicket haul. He took five wickets with an economy rate of 1.80 and a bowling average of 1.20 in that match. Al-Amin Hossain of the Barisal Bulls took the least economical five-wicket haul, bowling with an economy rate of 9.00.

Thisara Perera is the only cricketer to take multiple five-wicket hauls. Fourteen five-wicket hauls have been taken at the Sher-e-Bangla National Cricket Stadium. Al-Amin Hossain of Barisal Bulls is the only bowler to take a hat-trick and a five-wicket haul in a Bangladesh Premier League Match.

The 2017 season and 2019–20 season has seen the most number of five-wicket hauls in one season. Four five-wicket hauls had been taken in those seasons. While the 2013 and 2019 seasons had the fewest five-wicket hauls where no bowler could pick up a five-wicket haul. Thirteen times out of sixteen times a team won, when a player of that team picked up a five-wicket haul. Shakib Al Hasan and Nasir Hossain are the only players to take five-wicket haul while captaining their side. Shakib captained Dhaka Dynamites and Nasir captained the Sylhet Sixers.

Key

Five-wicket hauls

Season overview

See also 
 List of Bangladesh Premier League records and statistics
 List of Bangladesh Premier League centuries

Notes

References

External links 
 Official Bangladesh Premier League Website

Bangladesh Premier League lists
Bangladeshi cricket lists